Tory Kittles is an American actor. He has appeared in the films Malibu's Most Wanted (2003), Get Rich or Die Tryin' (2005), Next (2007), Miracle at St. Anna (2008), and Dragged Across Concrete (2018). He is known mostly for his television roles; he portrayed Laroy in Sons of Anarchy (2008–2011), and Broussard in Colony (2016–2018). He has also appeared in True Detective (2014) and The Equalizer (2021-present) as Detective Marcus Dante.

Filmography

Film

Television

References

External links
 
 

Living people
American male film actors
African-American male actors
American male television actors
21st-century American male actors
20th-century American male actors
People from Bradford County, Florida
20th-century African-American people
21st-century African-American people
Year of birth missing (living people)